Sudanese refugees are persons originating from the country of Sudan, but seeking refuge outside the borders of their native country. In recent history, Sudan has been the stage for prolonged conflicts and civil wars, as well as environmental changes, namely desertification. These forces have resulted not only in violence and famine but also the forced migration of large numbers of the Sudanese population, both inside and outside the country's borders. Given the expansive geographic territory of Sudan, and the regional and ethnic tensions and conflicts, much of the forced migration in Sudan has been internal. Yet, these populations are not immune to similar issues that typically accompany refugeedom, including economic hardship and providing themselves and their families with sustenance and basic needs. With the creation of a South Sudanese state, questions surrounding southern Sudanese IDPs may become questions of South Sudanese refugees.

Reasons for fleeing
The movement of populations within and around the territory of modern-day Sudan and its neighbors for trade, opportunity, climatic variations, and conflicts is not unique to recent or contemporary history. But these movements have intensified and become more concentrated for reasons including prolonged civil war, violence between various populations along ethnic and political lines, droughts and subsequent famines in the 1980s, and humanitarian emergencies and famine caused by improper responses to previous crises by international aid organizations. Movements of people are also inherently more problematic across international boundaries, which may be contradictory to natural population flows within the region.

Internally displaced Sudanese

An estimated 3.2 million Sudanese are internally displaced persons (IDPs), and another 78,000 are in IDP-like situations. 300,000 of these IDPs were newly displaced in the first months of 2013 due to renewed intertribal conflict. Continuing insecurity, combined with government restrictions on humanitarian access in the Darfur region, South Kordofan, and the Blue Nile States, has hampered UNHCR's activities.
Historically, refugee assistance programs in Sudan have relied on the definition of a refugee as one who has crossed an international frontier. This definition is increasingly inappropriate worldwide and especially so in Sudanic Africa, where the number of internally displaced persons (IDPs) exceeds the number of refugees.

Host countries

Chad

Egypt

Starting in the 1990s, the increase in refugees from Sudan has forced UNHCR RO Cairo to shift its focus from education and training to the care and maintenance of refugees. In Cairo, the International Organization for Migration (IOM) is involved in helping process refugees for resettlement, moving refugees, and assisting with their medical examinations. IOM also conducts cultural orientation for the refugees to prepare them for resettlement in third countries. The UNHCR regional office in Cairo (RO Cairo) is overextended, and after Somalis, the Sudanese (mainly southern Sudanese) represent the largest caseload. A large number of Sudanese refugees in Egypt reflects the fact that many Sudanese travels to Cairo to obtain official recognition of their refugee status from the UNHCR. The Sudanese refugees in Egypt fall under two categories: those who are waiting for their status-determination interview and those who have been rejected or who are self-settled. 
Between 60 and 70 percent of Sudanese asylum seekers have their applications for refugee status rejected. Rejection and closure of a file have serious psychological and emotional implications for refugees. Many of those rejected, especially men, turn to alcoholism as a way of overcoming their problems. Others become mentally disturbed and there have been reports of suicide or attempted suicide upon receiving news of the rejection. The unity of the family has been challenged by Sudanese refugees' quest for UNHCR recognition. Women and children wait in Cairo for their UNHCR applications to go through while husbands wait in Sudan.  The difficulties of life in Cairo and the inability of some husbands to join their families in Egypt have forced some women refugees to abandon their husbands, remarry, and leave for resettlement. In cases of rejection of a family application at the UNHCR, many men leave their wives and children and look for another single woman with UNHCR status to avoid responsibility. Additionally, UNHCR RO Cairo does not recognize polygamous unions, and as such will not refer polygamists for resettlement to countries where polygamy is not permitted. All of these factors have contributed to the break-up of families, divorce, and the abandonment of children. Finally, the UNHCR identity cards issued to refugees are not always recognized by the Egyptian authority. There have been situations in which people have been taken and detained for three to four days and then released, despite their UNHCR status. A resident permit stamp on a valid Sudanese passport seems to offer more protection for refugees.

Kenya
An estimated 52,000 Sudan refugees are living in Kenya.

Ethiopia
Ethiopia shelters about 70,000 refugees from Sudan, most of whom live in refugee camps in the Benishangul-Gumuz and Gambela Regions.

Uganda
 there are 848,203 refugees from South Sudan in Uganda.

Gulf countries

In the last quarter of the 20th century, many Sudanese migrated to the Gulf countries to seek work in light of the oil boom in the Gulf and the deterioration of Sudan's economy. The allure of Gulf migration waned starting in the 1990s as the Government of Sudan's support for Iraq in the Gulf War meant that some expatriates were expelled while others lived under tight restrictions. As Sudan was amidst its second civil war, the return was not an option, so many Gulf expatriates started moving to the United States and Canada on "lottery" or asylum and refugee tickets. As such, the traditional migration to Gulf countries is being used by some refugees to achieve further migration to Europe, the United States, Canada, and Australia.

Aid

Issues 

Due to the shortages in UNHCR assistance to Sudanese refugees, some Church groups have opened learning centers for refugee children. Furthermore, churches also offer training programs for adult refugees, provide food rations to families, in addition to financial assistance, health services, and job placement. With respect to those Sudanese living in shantytowns in Greater Khartoum or in other urban areas of Africa and the Middle East, remittances provided by kin resettledin Western countries have become an essential part of the overall income needed to meet daily subsistence and other critical needs. Urban refugees’ reliance on cash assistance from abroad is seen as a unique situation since there are few NGOs and humanitarian-based support mechanisms available to adequately meet the needs of refugees in Cairo, Beirut, Damascus, and elsewhere on Sudan’s periphery.

Gender issues 

In their communities, Sudanese women play a substantial economic role, as the inhabitants of the South depend on agriculture, grazing, fishing, and hunting. When forced to migrate to the capital Khartoum, women pick up marginal work that brings in little income and exposes them to the risk of arrest by authorities. Displaced women often sell tea or liquor, but since the sale of alcohol is illegal, this can lead to imprisonment. Displaced women also suffer in ways that men do not, and in the shantytowns and government-run camps around Khartoum, women continue to suffer violations of their rights and assaults on their bodily integrity.

In Egypt, many southern Sudanese women have entered the Egyptian workforce to support their families. As some men have assumed familial roles like food preparation and childcare, they have become sensitized to the difficulties women experience. Men, however, are uncomfortable with this role reversal and tend to emphasize the negative consequences it has on child development and the husband-wife relationship.

Durable solutions

Resettlement 

Whereas earlier waves of Sudanese refugees found asylum first in neighbouring countries, contemporary Sudanese refugees use these countries as a springboard for resettlement in a third country. Some refugees find themselves moving between different countries in the region in order to increase their chances for resettlement.

Repatriation 

Repatriation of Sudanese refugees remains difficult given the ongoing conflict and tensions in Darfur and South Sudan. The Comprehensive Peace Agreement (CPA) between the Government of Sudan and the Sudan People's Liberation Movement is viewed as the principal determinant of peace and stability in Sudan. 
This pact paved the way for the return of thousands of Sudanese refugees from neighboring countries.

In South Sudan, armed groups like Uganda's Lord's Resistance Army (LRA) and intertribal clashes have produced increased levels of violence. The patterns of violence point to a clear targeting of women and children. This presents a definite obstacle to repatriation. In Darfur, insecurity, land occupation, and crop destruction continue to generate fresh displacement and prevent returns.

Hosting refugees 

During the civil war between Eritrea and Ethiopia, many traveled to Sudan as refugees. These camps had a very harsh environment, medicine and clean water were scarce. Some survived on other nations. (e.g. UN Rations).
Nowadays, in 2016, there are 232,000 South Sudanese refugees in Sudan.

See also
 Refugees
 Sudanese refugees in Israel
 Darfur conflict
 Sudanese Civil War (disambiguation)
 Lost Boys of Sudan
 1998 Sudan famine
 Refugees of South Sudan

References

Further reading 

 Flint, J. & de Waal, J. (2008). Darfur: a new history of a long war. New York: Zed Books.
 Abusharaf, R. (2009). Transforming displaced women in Sudan: politics and the body in a squatter settlement. Chicago: University of Chicago Press.
 Edwards, J. (2007). Sudanese women refugees: transformations and future imaginings. New York: Macmillan.

External links 

 2011 UNHCR country operations profile - Sudan United Nations High Commissioner for Refugees
 Photographer's Account of Sudanese Refugees - "The Cost of Silence: A Traveling Exhibition"

Foreign relations of Sudan
Sudanese refugees
South Sudanese diaspora